The following is a list of species of Habenaria recognised by the World Checklist of Selected Plant Families as at August 2018:

 Habenaria aberrans Schltr.
 Habenaria abortiens Lindl.
 Habenaria acalcarata Espejo & Lopez-Ferr.
 Habenaria achalensis Kraenzl.
 Habenaria achnantha Rchb.f.
 Habenaria achroantha Schltr.
 Habenaria achianthioides Schltr.
 Habenaria acuifera Wall. ex Lindl.
 Habenaria acuminata (Thwaites) Trimen
 Habenaria acuticalcar H.Perrier
 Habenaria adenantha A.Rich. & Galeotti
 Habenaria adolphi Schltr.
 Habenaria aethiopithica S.Thomas & P.J.Cribb
 Habenaria agapitae R.Gonzalez & Reynoso
 Habenaria agrestis R.Gonzalez & Cuev.-Fig.
 Habenaria aguirrei R.Gonzalez & Cuev.-Fig.
 Habenaria aitchisonii Rchb.f.
 Habenaria alagensis Ames
 Habenaria alata Hook. – winged bog orchid
 Habenaria albidorubra J.J.Sm.
 Habenaria alinae Szlach.
 Habenaria alpestris Cogn.
 Habenaria alta Ridl.
 Habenaria alterosula Snuv. & Westra
 Habenaria altior 
 Habenaria amalfitana F.Lehm & Kraenzl.
 Habenaria amambayensis Szlach.
 Habenaria amboinensis J.J.Sm.
 Habenaria ambositrana Schltr.
 Habenaria amoena Summerh.
 Habenaria amplexicaulis Rolfe & Downie
 Habenaria amplifolia Cheeseman
 Habenaria anaphysema Rchb.f.
 Habenaria adamanica Hook.f.
 Habenaria anguiceps Bolus
 Habenaria angustissima Summerh.
 Habenaria anisitsii Kraenzl.
 Habenaria ankylocentron Schuit. & J.J.Verm.
 Habenaria anomaliflora Kurzweil & Chantanaorr.
 Habenaria antennifera A.rich.
 Habenaria apetala Gagnep.
 Habenaria apiculata Summerh.
 Habenaria arachnoides 
 Habenaria aranaria Thoars
 Habenaria aranifera Lindl.
 Habenaria arecunarum Schltr.
 Habenaria arenaria Lindl.
 Habenaria arenata G.A.Romero & J.A.N.Bat.
 Habenaria argentea P.J.Cribb
 Habenaria arianae Geerinck
 Habenaria aricaensis Hoehne
 Habenaria arietina Hook.f.
 Habenaria aristulifera Rchb.f.
 Habenaria armata Rchb.f.
 Habenaria armatissima Rchb.f.
 Habenaria atrata R.Gonzalez & Cuev.-Fig.
 Habenaria atrocalcarata R.Gonzalez & Cuev.-Fig.
 Habenaria attenuata Hook.f.
 Habenaria auriculoba J.J.Sm.
 Habenaria australis J.A.N.Bat.
 Habenaria austrosinensis Tang & F.T.Wang
 Habenaria avana Hook.f.
 Habenaria avicula Schltr.
 Habenaria aviculoides Ames & C.Schweinf.
 Habenaria ayangannensis Renz
 Habenaria bacata Dressler 
 Habenaria backeri J.J.Sm. 
 Habenaria baeuerlenii F.Muell. & Kraenzl. 
 Habenaria bahiensis Schltr. 
 Habenaria balansae Cogn. 
 Habenaria balfouriana Schltr. 
 Habenaria baliensis J.J.Sm. 
 Habenaria balimensis Ormoerod 
 Habenaria bangii Schltr. 
 Habenaria bantamensis J.J.Sm. 
 Habenaria barbata Wight ex Hook.f. 
 Habenaria barbertoni Kraenzl. & Schltr. 
 Habenaria barnesii Summerh. ex C.E.C.Fisch. 
 Habenaria barrina Ridl. 
 Habenaria batesii la Croix 
 Habenaria bathiei Schltr. 
 Habenaria beccarii Schltr. 
 Habenaria beharensis Bosser 
 Habenaria belloi Schltr. 
 Habenaria bequaertii Summerm. 
 Habenaria bermejoensis Schltr. 
 Habenaria berroana Bar.Rodr. 
 Habenaria bertauxiana Szlach. & Olszewski 
 Habenaria bicolor Conrath & Kraenzl. 
 Habenaria bicornis Lindl. 
 Habenaria binghamii G.Will. 
 Habenaria boadanensis Ames 
 Habenaria boiviniana Rchb.f. 
 Habenaria bonateoides Ponsie 
 Habenaria bongensium Rchb.f. 
 Habenaria bosseriana Szlacj. & Olszewski 
 Habenaria bougainvilleae Renz 
 Habenaria brachydactyla J.A.N.Bat. & Bianch. 
 Habenaria brachyphylla (Lindl.) Aitch. 
 Habenaria brachyphyton Schltr. ex. Mansf. 
 Habenaria brachyplectron Hoehne & Schltr. 
 Habenaria bracteosa Hoechst. ex A.Rich. 
 Habenaria bractescens Lindl. 
 Habenaria brevidens Lindl. 
 Habenaria brevilabiata A.Rich. & Galeotti 
 Habenaria brittoniae Ames 
 Habenaria brownelliana Catling 
 Habenaria buettneriana Kraenzl. 
 Habenaria burtii Summerh. 
 Habenaria busseana Kraenzl. 
 Habenaria caffra Schltr.
 Habenaria calcicola Aver.
 Habenaria caldensis Kraenzl.
 Habenaria calicis R.Gonzalez
 Habenaria calvilabris Summerh.
 Habenaria campylogyna J.A.N.Bat. & Bianch.
 Habenaria canastrensis J.A.N.Bat. & B.M.Carvalho
 Habenaria candolleana Cogn.
 Habenaria caranjensis Dalzell
 Habenaria cardiostigmatica J.A.N.Bat. & Bianch.
 Habenaria carinata Span.
 Habenaria carlotae Dressler
 Habenaria carnea Weathers
 Habenaria carvajaliana R.Gonzalez & Cuevas-Fig.
 Habenaria casillasii R.Gonzalez & Cuevas-Fig.
 Habenaria castroi R.Gonzalez & Cuevas-Fig.
 Habenaria cataphysema Rchb.f.
 Habenaria caucana Schltr.
 Habenaria cauda-porcelli Schuit. & J.J.Verm.
 Habenaria cavatibrachia Summerh.
 Habenaria celebica Kraenzl.
 Habenaria cephalotes Lindl.
 Habenaria cerea Blatt. & McCann
 Habenaria chirensis Rchb.f.
 Habenaria chlorina C.S.P.Parish & Rchb.f.
 Habenaria chlorosepala D.L.Jones – green-hooded rein orchid
 Habenaria christianii Schltr.
 Habenaria ciliatisepala J.A.N.Bat. & Bianch.
 Habenaria ciliolaris Kraenzl.
 Habenaria ciliosa Lindl.
 Habenaria cirrhata (Lindl.) Rchb.f.
 Habenaria clareae Hermans
 Habenaria clarencensis Rolfe
 Habenaria clavata (Lindl.) Rchb.f.
 Habenaria clypeata Lindl.
 Habenaria cochleicalcar Bosser
 Habenaria coeloglossoides Summerh.
 Habenaria cogniaxiana Kraenzl.
 Habenaria commelinifolia (Roxb.) Wall. ex Lindl.
 Habenaria comorensis H.Perrier
 Habenaria compta Summerh.
 Habenaria congesta Ames
 Habenaria conopodes Ridl.
 Habenaria conopsea Rchb.f.
 Habenaria contrerasii R.Gonzalez & Cuevas-Fig.
 Habenaria cornuta Lindl.
 Habenaria cornutella Summerh.
 Habenaria cortesii R.Gonzalez & Cuevas-Fig.
 Habenaria corticicola W.W.Sm.
 Habenaria corydophora Rchb.f.
 Habenaria corymbosa C.S.P.Parish & Rchb.f.
 Habenaria costaricensis Schltr.
 Habenaria coultousii Barretto
 Habenaria coxipoensis Hoehne
 Habenaria crassicornis Lindl.
 Habenaria crassilabia Kraenzl.
 Habenaria cribbiana Szlach. & Olszewski
 Habenaria crinifera Lindl. – doll orchid
 Habenaria cruciata J.J.Sm.
 Habenaria crucifera Rchb.f. & Warm. 
 Habenaria cruciformis Ohwi
 Habenaria cryptophila Barb.Rodr.
 Habenaria cualensis R.Gonzalez & Cuevas-Fig.
 Habenaria cuevasiana R.Gonzalez & Cuevas-Fig.
 Habenaria culicina Rchb.f. & Warm.
 Habenaria culmiformis Schltr.
 Habenaria cultellifolia Barb.Rodr.
 Habenaria cultrata A.Rich.
 Habenaria cultriformis Kraenzl.
 Habenaria culveri Schltr.
 Habenaria curranii Ames
 Habenaria curvicalcar J.J.Sm.
 Habenaria curvilabra Barb.Rodr.
 Habenaria dalzielii Summerh.
 Habenaria davidii Franch.
 Habenaria debeerstiana Kraenzl.
 Habenaria decaptera Rchb.f.
 Habenaria decaryana H.Perrier
 Habenaria decorata Hochst. ex A.Rich.
 Habenaria decumbens S.Thomas & P.J.Cribb
 Habenaria decurvirostris Summerh.
 Habenaria delavayi Finet
 Habenaria demissa Schltr.
 Habenaria dentata (Sw.) Schltr.
 Habenaria denticulata Rchb.f.
 Habenaria dentifera C.Schweinf.
 Habenaria dentirostrata Tang & F.T.Wang
 Habenaria depressifolia Hoehne
 Habenaria dichopetala Thwaites
 Habenaria diffusa A.Rich. & Galeotti
 Habenaria digitata Lindl.
 Habenaria dinklagei Kraenzl.
 Habenaria diphylla (Nimmo) Dalzell
 Habenaria diplonema Schltr.
 Habenaria diselloides Schltr.
 Habenaria disparilis Summerh.
 Habenaria distans Griseb.
 Habenaria distantiflora A.Rich.
 Habenaria ditricha Hook.f.
 Habenaria divaricata R.S.Rogers & C.T.White
 Habenaria divergens Summerh.
 Habenaria dives Rchb.f.
 Habenaria dolichostachya Thwaites
 Habenaria dracaenifolia Schltr.
 Habenaria dregeana Lindl.
 Habenaria drepanopetala Pabst
 Habenaria dryadum Schltr.
 Habenaria dusenii Schltr.
 Habenaria dutrae Schltr.
 Habenaria eatoniana R.Gonzalez & Cuevas-Fig.
 Habenaria edgarii Summerh.
 Habenaria edwallii Cogn.
 Habenaria egleriana Summerh.
 Habenaria ekmaniana Kraenzl.
 Habenaria elatius Ridl.
 Habenaria elliptica Wight
 Habenaria elongata R.Br. – white rein orchid
 Habenaria elwesii Hook.f.
 Habenaria engleriana Kraenzl.
 Habenaria ensifolia Lindl.
 Habenaria ensigera Renz
 Habenaria entomantha (Lex.) Lindl.
 Habenaria epipactiada Rchb.f.
 Habenaria erinacea Cordem.
 Habenaria ernesti-ulei Hoehne
 Habenaria ernestii Schltr.
 Habenaria ernstii Schltr.
 Habenaria erostrata Tang & F.T.Wang
 Habenaria espinhacensis J.A.N.Bat. & A.A.Vale
 Habenaria euryloba D.L.Jones – small rein orchid
 Habenaria eustachya Rchb.f. – woodland bog orchid
 Habenaria exaltata Barb.Rodr.
 Habenaria excelsa S.Thomas & P.J.Cribb
 Habenaria exilis D.L.Jones – wispy rein orchid
 Habenaria falcata G.Will.
 Habenaria falcatopetala Seidenf.
 Habenaria falcicornis (Lindl.) Bolus
 Habenaria falcigera Rchb.f.
 Habenaria falciloba Summerh.
 Habenaria fargesii Finet
 Habenaria felipensis Ames
 Habenaria ferdinandi Schltr. – yellow rein orchid
 Habenaria ferkoana Schltr.
 Habenaria filicornis Lindl.
 Habenaria filifera S.Watson
 Habenaria fimbriatiloba Kolan.
 Habenaria finetiana Schltr.
 Habenaria flabelliformis Summerh. ex C.E.C.Fisch.
 Habenaria flaccidifolia Schltr.
 Habenaria flexuosa Lindl.
 Habenaria floribunda Lindl.
 Habenaria fluminensis Hoehne
 Habenaria foliosa A.Rich.
 Habenaria fordii Rolfe
 Habenaria foxii Ridl.
 Habenaria frappieri J.-B.Castillon & P.Bernet
 Habenaria fulva Tang & F.T.Wang
 Habenaria furcifera Lindl.
 Habenaria fuscina D.L.Jones – green rein orchid
 Habenaria galactantha Kraenzl.
 Habenaria galeandriformis Hoehne
 Habenaria galipanensis Kraenzl.
 Habenaria galpinii Bolus
 Habenaria garayana Szlach., & Olszewski
 Habenaria geerinckiana (Schaijes) Geerinck
 Habenaria genuflexa Rendle
 Habenaria gibsonii Hook.f.
 Habenaria gilbertii S.Thomas & P.J.Cribb
 Habenaria giriensis J.J.Sm.
 Habenaria glaucifolia Bureau & Franch.
 Habenaria glaucophylla Barb.Rodr.
 Habenaria glazioviana Kraenzl. ex Cogn.
 Habenaria godefroyi Rchb.f.
 Habenaria goetzeana Kraenzl.
 Habenaria gollmeri Schltr.
 Habenaria gonatosiphon Summerh.
 Habenaria gonzaleztamayoi Garcia-Cruz, R.Jimenez & L.Sanchez
 Habenaria gourlieana Gillies ex Lindl.
 Habenaria goyazensis Cogn.
 Habenaria gracilis Lindl.
 Habenaria grandifloriformis Blatt. & McCann
 Habenaria greenwoodiana R.Gonzalez
 Habenaria guadalajarana S.Watson
 Habenaria guaraensis J.A.N.Bat. & Bianch.
 Habenaria guentheriana Kraenzl.
 Habenaria guilleminii Rchb.f.
 Habenaria gustavo-edwallii Hoehne
 Habenaria haareri Summerh.
 Habenaria habenarioides (Hoehne)R.E.Nogueira & R.J.V.Alves
 Habenaria halata D.L.Jones – sweet rein orchid
 Habenaria halibergii Blatt. & McCann
 Habenaria hamata Barb.Rodr.
 Habenaria hannae Szlach.
 Habenaria harderi Aver & Averyanova
 Habenaria harmsiana Schltr.
 Habenaria harroldii D.L.Jones – southern rein orchid
 Habenaria hassleriana Cogn. ex Chodat & Hassl.
 Habenaria hastata Seidenf.
 Habenaria hatschbachii Pabst
 Habenaria hebes la Croix & P.J.Cribb
 Habenaria heleogena Schltr.
 Habenaria helicoplectrum Summerh.
 Habenaria henschiana Barb.Rodr.
 Habenaria heptadactyla Rchb.f.
 Habenaria heringi Pabst
 Habenaria herminioides Kraenzl.
 Habenaria hewittii Ridl.
 Habenaria hexaptera Lindl.
 Habenaria heyneana Lindl.
 Habenaria hieronymi Kraenzl.
 Habenaria hilsenbergii Ridl.
 Habenaria hippocrepica J.A.N.Bat. & Bianch.
 Habenaria hirsutissima Summerh.
 Habenaria hirsutitrunci G.Will.
 Habenaria hollandiana Santapau
 Habenaria hologlossa Summerh.
 Habenaria holothrix Schltr.
 Habenaria holotricha Gagnep.
 Habenaria holubii Rolfe
 Habenaria horaliae R.Gonzalez
 Habenaria horsfieldiana Kraenzl.
 Habenaria hosseusii Schltr.
 Habenaria huberti Carnevali & G.Morillo
 Habenaria huillensis Rchb.f.
 Habenaria humbertii Szlach. & Olszewski
 Habenaria humidicola Rolfe
 Habenaria humilior Rchb.f.
 Habenaria hydrophila Barb.Rodr.
 Habenaria hymenophylla Schltr. – coastal rein orchid
 Habenaria ibarrae R.Gonzalez
 Habenaria ichneumonea (Sw.) Lindl.
 Habenaria idroboi Szlach. & Kolan.
 Habenaria imbricata Kraenzl.
 Habenaria inaequaliloba Schltr.
 Habenaria incarnata (Lyall ex Lindl.) Richb.f.
 Habenaria incompta Kraenzl.
 Habenaria inexspectata R.Gonzalez & Cuev.-Fig.
 Habenaria insolit Summerh.
 Habenaria insularis Schltr.
 Habenaria integrilabris J.J.Sm.
 Habenaria integripetala Cogn.
 Habenaria intermedia D.Don
 Habenaria irazuensis Schltr.
 Habenaria irwiniana J.A.N.Bat. & Bianch.
 Habenaria isoantha Schltr.
 Habenaria itaculumia Garay
 Habenaria itatiayae Schltr.
 Habenaria ixtlanensis E.W.Greenw.
 Habenaria jacobii Summerh.
 Habenaria jaegeri Summerh.
 Habenaria jaguariahyvae Kraenzl.
 Habenaria jaliscana S.Watson
 Habenaria janellehayneana Choltco, B.Maloney & Yong Gee
 Habenaria jardeliana R.Gonzalez & Cuev.-Fig.
 Habenaria javanica Kraenzl.
 Habenaria johannae Kraenzl.
 Habenaria johannensis Barb.Rodr.
 Habenaria jordanensis (Leite) Garay
 Habenaria josephensis Barb.Rodr.
 Habenaria juruenensis Hoehne
 Habenaria kabompoensis G.Will.
 Habenaria kariniae R.Gonzalez & Cuev.-Fig.
 Habenaria kassneriana Kraenzl.
 Habenaria katangensis Summerh.
 Habenaria kaeyi Summerh.
 Habenaria keniensis Summerh.
 Habenaria keyensis Schltr.
 Habenaria khakhaengensis Makerd & Kurzweil
 Habenaria khasiana Hook.f.
 Habenaria kilimanjari Rchb.f.
 Habenaria kingii Hook.f.
 Habenaria kjellbergii J.J.Sm.
 Habenaria kleinii Menini & J.A.N.Bat.
 Habenaria kolweziensis Geerinck & Schaijes
 Habenaria koordersii J.J.Sm.
 Habenaria kornasiana Szlach.
 Habenaria kornasiorum Szlach. & Olszewski
 Habenaria korthalsiana Kraenzl.
 Habenaria kraenzliniana Schltr.
 Habenaria kraenslinii J.M.H.Shaw
 Habenaria kyimbilae Schltr.
 Habenaria lactiflora A.Rich. & Galeotti
 Habenaria laevigata Lindl.
 Habenaria lamii J.J.Sm.
 Habenaria lancifolia A.Rich.
 Habenaria langenheimii Szlach. & Kolan
 Habenaria lankesteri Ames
 Habenaria lastelleana Kraenzl.
 Habenaria laurentii De Wild.
 Habenaria lavrensis Hoehne
 Habenaria leandriana Bosser
 Habenaria lecardii Kraenzl.
 Habenaria lefebureana (A.Rich.) T.Durand & Schinz
 Habenaria lehii Eb.Fisch.,Killmann, Leh, Lebel & Delep.
 Habenaria lehmanniana Kraenzl.
 Habenaria leibergii Ames
 Habenaria lelyi Summerh.
 Habenaria leon-ibarrae R.Jimenez & Carnevali
 Habenaria leonensis Kraenzl. ex T.Durand & Schinz
 Habenaria leprieurii Rchb.f.
 Habenaria leptantha Schltr.
 Habenaria leptoceras Hook.
 Habenaria leptoloba Benth.
 Habenaria letestuana Szlach. & Olszewski
 Habenaria letouzeyana (Szlach. & Olszewski) P.J.Cribb & Stevart
 Habenaria leucoceras Schltr.
 Habenaria leucosantha Barb.Rodr.
 Habenaria leucotricha Schltr.
 Habenaria lewallei Geerinck
 Habenaria libeniana Geerinck
 Habenaria ligulata C.Schweinf.
 Habenaria limprichtii Schltr.
 Habenaria lindblomii Schltr.
 Habenaria lindleyana Steud.
 Habenaria linearifolia Maxim.
 Habenaria linearis King & Pantl.
 Habenaria linguella Lindl.
 Habenaria linguicrucis Rchb.f.
 Habenaria linguiformis Summerh.
 Habenaria lingulosa Ames
 Habenaria linifolia C.Presl
 Habenaria lisenarum G.A.Romero & J.A.N.Bat.
 Habenaria lisowskiana Geerinck
 Habenaria lisowskii Szlach.
 Habenaria lithophila Schltr.
 Habenaria livingstoniana la Croix & P.J.Crib
 Habenaria lizbethae R.Gonzalez & Cuevas-Fig.
 Habenaria lobbii Rchb.f.
 Habenaria loerzingii J.J.Sm.
 Habenaria loloorum Schltr.
 Habenaria longa Cordem.
 Habenaria longicauda Hook.
 Habenaria longicaudiculata J.Graham
 Habenaria longicornu Lindl.
 Habenaria longifolia Buch.-Ham. ex Lindl.
 Habenaria longipedicellata Hoehne
 Habenaria longiracema Fukuy.
 Habenaria longirostris Summerh.
 Habenaria longitheca Seidenf.
 Habenaria lucaecapensis Fernald
 Habenaria lucida Wall. ex Lindl.
 Habenaria ludibundiciliata J.A.N.Bat. & Bianch.
 Habenaria luegiana (Kras & Szlach.) J.M.H.Shaw
 Habenaria luentensis Szlach. & Olszewski
 Habenaria luetzelburgii Schltr.
 Habenaria luquanensis G.W.Hu
 Habenaria luzmariana R.Gonzalez
 Habenaria macilenta (Lindl.) Rchb.f.
 Habenaria macraithii Lavarack - whiskered rein orchid
 Habenaria macrandra Lindl.
 Habenaria macrantha Hochst. ex A.Rich.
 Habenaria macroceratitis Willd.
 Habenaria macrodactyla Kraenzl.
 Habenaria macronectar (Vell.) Hoehne
 Habenaria macroplectron Schltr.
 Habenaria macrostachya Lindl.
 Habenaria macrostele Summerh.
 Habenaria macrotidion Summerh.
 Habenaria macrura Kraenzl.
 Habenaria macruroides Summerh.
 Habenaria maculosa Lindl.
 Habenaria macvaughiana R.Gonzalez
 Habenaria maderoi Schltr.
 Habenaria magdalenensis Hoehne
 Habenaria magnibracteata R.Gonzalez & Cuev.-Fig.
 Habenaria magnifica Fritsch
 Habenaria magnirostris Summerh.
 Habenaria magniscutata Catling
 Habenaria mairei Schltr.
 Habenaria maitlandii Summerh.
 Habenaria malacophylla Rchb.f.
 Habenaria malaisseana Geerinck
 Habenaria malintana (Blanco) Merr.
 Habenaria malleifera Hook.f.
 Habenaria mandersii Collett & Hemsl.
 Habenaria mannii Hook.f.
 Habenaria marginata Colebr.
 Habenaria mariae R.Gonzalez & Cuev.-Fig.
 Habenaria marquisensis F.Br.
 Habenaria massoniana King & Pantl.
 Habenaria matudae Salazar
 Habenaria mechowii Rchb.f.
 Habenaria mediocris Dressler
 Habenaria medioflexa Turrill
 Habenaria medusa Kraenzl.
 Habenaria meeana Toscano
 Habenaria megapotamensis Hoehne
 Habenaria melanopoda Hoehne & Schltr.
 Habenaria mello-barretoi Brade & Pabst
 Habenaria melvillei Ridl.
 Habenaria mesodactyla Griseb.
 Habenaria mesophylla Kraenzl.
 Habenaria micheliana R.Gonzalez & Cuev.-Fig.
 Habenaria micholitziana Kraenzl. & Schltr.
 Habenaria microceras Hook.f.
 Habenaria microsaccus Kraenzl.
 Habenaria microstylina Rchb.f.
 Habenaria mientienensis Tang & F.T.Wang
 Habenaria millei Schltr.
 Habenaria minima R.Gonzalez & Cuev.-Fig.
 Habenaria minuta J.A.N.Bat. & Bianch.
 Habenaria mira Summerh.
 Habenaria mirabilis Rolfe
 Habenaria mitodes Garay 7 W.Kittr.
 Habenaria modestissima Rchb.f.
 Habenaria monadenioides Schltr.
 Habenaria monogyne Schltr.
 Habenaria monorrhiza (Sw.) Rchb.f. – tropical bog orchid
 Habenaria montevidensis Spreng.
 Habenaria montis-wilhelminae Renz
 Habenaria montolivaea Kraenzl. ex Engl.
 Habenaria mosambicensis Schltr.
 Habenaria mossii (G.Will.) J.C.Manning
 Habenaria multicaudata Sedgw.
 Habenaria multipartita Blume ex Kraenzl.
 Habenaria muricata (Schauer) Rchb.f.
 Habenaria myodes Summerh.
 Habenaria myriotricha Gagnep.
 Habenaria nalbesiensis J.J.Sm.
 Habenaria nasuta Rchb.f. & Warm.
 Habenaria nautiloides H.Perrier
 Habenaria ndiana Rendle
 Habenaria nematocerata Tang & F.T.Wang
 Habenaria nemorosa Barb.Rodr.
 Habenaria nepalensis Kolan.
 Habenaria nicholsonii Rolfe
 Habenaria nigerica Sumerh.
 Habenaria nigrescens Summerh.
 Habenaria nilssonii Foldats
 Habenaria njamnjamica Kraenzl.
 Habenaria nogeirana R.Gonzalez & Cuev.-Fig.
 Habenaria notabilis Schltr.
 Habenaria novaehiberniae Schltr.
 Habenaria novaesii Edwall & Hoehne
 Habenaria novemfida Lindl.
 Habenaria nuda Lindl.
 Habenaria nyikana Rchb.f.
 Habenaria nyikensis G.Will.
 Habenaria obovata Summerh.
 Habenaria obtusa Lindl.
 Habenaria occidentalis (Lindl.) Summerh.
 Habenaria occlusa Summerh.
 Habenaria ochroleuca R.Br. – sickle orchid
 Habenaria odorate Schltr.
 Habenaria oerstedii Rchb.f.
 Habenaria ofeliae R.Gonzalez & Cuev.-Fig.
 Habenaria orchiocalcar Hoehne
 Habenaria oreophila Greenm.
 Habenaria orthocentron P.J.Cribb
 Habenaria ortiziana 
 Habenaria osmastonii Karthig.
 Habenaria ospinae Szlach. & Kolan.
 Habenaria pabstii J.A.N.Bat. & Bianch.
 Habenaria paivaeana Rchb.f.
 Habenaria pallideviridis Seidenf. ex K.M.Matthew
 Habenaria paningrahiana S.Misra
 Habenaria pansarinii J.A.N.Bat. & Bianch.
 Habenaria pantlingiana Kraenzl.
 Habenaria papyracea Scgltr.
 Habenaria paradiseoides J.J.Sm.
 Habenaria paranaensis Barb.Rodr.
 Habenaria parva (Summerh.) Summerh.
 Habenaria parvicalcarata C.Schweinf.
 Habenaria parvidens Lindl.
 Habenaria parviflora Lindl.
 Habenaria parvipetala J.J.Sm.
 Habenaria pasmithii G.Will.
 Habenaria patentiloba Ames
 Habenaria paucipartita J.J.Sm.
 Habenaria paulensis Porsch
 Habenaria paulistana J.A.N.Bat. & Bianch.
 Habenaria pauper Summerh.
 Habenaria pectinata 
 Habenaria pentadactyla Lindl.
 Habenaria perbella Rchb.f.
 Habenaria perezii R.Gonzalez & Cuev.-Fig.
 Habenaria peristyloides A.Rich.
 Habenaria periyarensis Sasidh., K.P.Rajesh & Augustine
 Habenaria perpulchra Kraenzl.
 Habenaria perrottetiana A.Rich.
 Habenaria petalodes Lindl.
 Habenaria petelotii Gagnep.
 Habenaria petitiana (A.Rich.) T.Durand & Schinz
 Habenaria petraea Renz & Grosvenor
 Habenaria petrogeiton Schltr.
 Habenaria petromedusa Webb
 Habenaria phantasma la Croix
 Habenaria philopsychra Ridl.
 Habenaria phylacocheira Summerh.
 Habenaria physuriformis Kraenzl.
 Habenaria pilosa Schltr.
 Habenaria pinnatipartita J.J.Sm.
 Habenaria pinzonii R.Gonzalez & Cuev.-Fig.
 Habenaria piraquarensis Hoehne
 Habenaria plantaginea Lindl.
 Habenaria platanthera Rchb.f.
 Habenaria platantheroides Schltr.
 Habenaria platyanthera Richb.f.
 Habenaria platydactyla Kraenzl.
 Habenaria plectromaniaca Rchb.f. & S.Moore
 Habenaria pleiophylla Hoehne & Schltr.
 Habenaria plurifoliata Tang & F.T.Wang
 Habenaria poilanei Gagnep.
 Habenaria polycarpa Hoehne
 Habenaria polygonoides Schltr.
 Habenaria polyodon Hook.f.
 Habenaria polyrhiza Schltr.
 Habenaria polyschista Schltr.
 Habenaria polytricha Rolfe
 Habenaria porphyricola Schltr.
 Habenaria praelta (Thouars) Spreng.
 Habenaria praecox Lavarack & A.W.Dockrill – early rein orchid
 Habenaria praestans Rendle
 Habenaria praetermissa Seidenf.
 Habenaria pratensis (Lindl.) Rchb.f.
 Habenaria prazeri King & Pantl.
 Habenaria pringlei B.L.Rob.
 Habenaria prionocraspedon Summerh.
 Habenaria procera (Afzel. ex Sw.) Lindl.
 Habenaria propinquior Rchb.f. – common rein orchid
 Habenaria protusorostrata R.Gonzalez & Cuev.-Fig.
 Habenaria psammophila J.A.N.Bat., Bianch. & B.M.Carvalho
 Habenaria pseudocaldensis Kraenzl.
 Habenaria pseudociliosa Schelpe ex J.C.Manning
 Habenaria pseudoculicina J.A.N.Bat. & B.M.Carvalho
 Habenaria pseudofilifera R.Gonzalez & Cuev.-Fig.
 Habenaria pseudoglaucophylla J.A.N.Bat., R.C.Mota & N.Abreu
 Habenaria pseudohamata Toscana
 Habenaria pterocarpa Thwaites
 Habenaria pubescens Lindl.
 Habenaria pubidactyla J.A.N.Bat. & Bianch.
 Habenaria pubidens P.J.Cribb
 Habenaria pubipetala Summerh.
 Habenaria pumila Poepp.
 Habenaria pumiloides C.Schweinf.
 Habenaria pungens Cogn. ex Kuntze
 Habenaria pycnostachya Barb.Rodr.
 Habenaria pygmaea C.Schweinf. & R.E.Schult.
 Habenaria quadrata Lindl.
 Habenaria quadriferricola J.A.N.Bat. & B.M.Carvalho
 Habenaria quadrifolia Frapp. ex Cordem.
 Habenaria quartiana A.Rich.
 Habenaria quartzicola Schltr.
 Habenaria quinquecarinata R.Gonzalez & Cuev.-Fig.
 Habenaria quinqueseta (Michx.) Eaton – longhorn bog orchid
 Habenaria ramayyana Ram.Chary & J.J.Wood
 Habenaria rariflora A.Ricj.
 Habenaria rautaneniana Kraenzl.
 Habenaria rechingeri Renz
 Habenaria reflexa Blume
 Habenaria reflexicalcar J.A.N.Bat. & B.M.Carvalho
 Habenaria regnellii Cogn.
 Habenaria reniformis (D.Don) Hook.f.
 Habenaria renziana Szlach. & Olszewski
 Habenaria repens Nutt. – waterspider bog orchid
 Habenaria retinervis Summerh.
 Habenaria retroflexa F.Muell. & Kraenzl.
 Habenaria rhodocheila Hance
 Habenaria rhopalostigma Rolfe ex Kraenzl.
 Habenaria rhynchocarpa (Thwaites) Trimen
 Habenaria richardiana Wight
 Habenaria richardii Cordem.
 Habenaria richardsiae Summerh.
 Habenaria ridleyana Kraenzl.
 Habenaria riparia Renz & Grosvenor
 Habenaria rivae Kraenzl.
 Habenaria robbrechtiana Geerink & Schaijes
 Habenaria robinsonii Ames
 Habenaria robusta Welw. ex Rchb.f.
 Habenaria robustior (Wight) Hook.f.
 Habenaria rodeiensis Barb.Rodr.
 Habenaria rodriguesii Cogn.
 Habenaria roemeriana T.Durand & Schinz
 Habenaria rolfeana Schltr.
 Habenaria roraimensis Rolfe
 Habenaria rosilloana R.Gonzalez & Cuev.-Fig.
 Habenaria rostellifera Rchb.f.
 Habenaria rostrata Wall. ex Lindl.
 Habenaria rosulata Ames
 Habenaria rosulifolia Espejo & Lopez-Ferr.
 Habenaria rotundiloba Pabst
 Habenaria roxburghii Nicolson
 Habenaria ruizii R.Gonzalez
 Habenaria rumphii (Brongn.) Lindl. – stiff rein orchid
 Habenaria rupestris Poepp. & Endl.
 Habenaria rupicola Barb.Rodr.
 Habenaria rzedowskiana R.Gonzalez
 Habenaria rzedowskii R.Gonzalez
 Habenaria sacculata (Balf.f. & S.Moore) T.Durand & Schinz
 Habenaria sagittifera Rchb.f.
 Habenaria sahyadrica K.M.P.Kumar, Nirmesh, V.B.Sreek & Kumar
 Habenaria salaccensis Blume
 Habenaria samoensis F.Muell. & Kraenzl.
 Habenaria sampaioana Schltr.
 Habenaria sandfordiana Szlach. & Olszewski
 Habenaria santanae R.Gonzalez & Cuev.-Fig.
 Habenaria santensis Barb.Rodr.
 Habenaria saprophytica Bosser & P.J.Cribb
 Habenaria sartor Lindl.
 Habenaria sastrei Szlach. & Kolan.
 Habenaria sceptrophora Garay
 Habenaria schaffneri S.Watson
 Habenaria schaijesii Geerinck
 Habenaria schenckii Cogn.
 Habenaria schimperiana Hochst, ex A.Rich.
 Habenaria schindleri Schltr.
 Habenaria schomburgkii Lindl.
 Habenaria schultzei Schltr.
 Habenaria schwackei Barb.Rodr.
 Habenaria sebastianensis R.Gonzalez & Cuev.-Fig.
 Habenaria secunda Lindl.
 Habenaria secundiflora Barb.Rodr.
 Habenaria setacea Lindl.
 Habenaria seticauda Lindl.
 Habenaria setifolia Carr
 Habenaria shweliensis W.W.Sm. & Banerji
 Habenaria siamensis Schltr.
 Habenaria sigillum Thoars
 Habenaria silvatica Schltr.
 Habenaria simillima Rchb.f.
 Habenaria simplex Kraenzl.
 Habenaria singapurensis Ridl.
 Habenaria singularis Summerh.
 Habenaria smithii Schltr.
 Habenaria snowdenii Summerh.
 Habenaria sobraliana J.A.N.Bat., Vale & Menini
 Habenaria sochensis Rchb.f.
 Habenaria socialis Fawc. & Rendle
 Habenaria socorroae R.Gonzalez & Cuev.-Fig.
 Habenaria socotrana Balf.f.
 Habenaria spanophytica J.A.N.Blanch. & Bianch.
 Habenaria spathiphylla J.J.Sm.
 Habenaria spathulifera Cogn.
 Habenaria spatulifolia C.S.P.Parish & Rchb.f.
 Habenaria speciosa Poepp. & Endl.
 Habenaria spencei Blatt. & McCann
 Habenaria spiraloides Cordem.
 Habenaria spithamaea Schltr.
 Habenaria splendens Rendle
 Habenaria splendentior Summerh.
 Habenaria sprucei Cogn.
 Habenaria st-simonensis Hoehne
 Habenaria stanislawii (Kras & Szlach.) J.M.H.Shaw
 Habenaria stenoceras Summerh.
 Habenaria stenochila Lindl.
 Habenaria stenopetala Lindl.
 Habenaria stenophylla Summerh.
 Habenaria stenorhynchos Schltr.
 Habenaria stolzii Schltr.
 Habenaria strangulans Summerh.
 Habenaria strictissima Rchb.f.
 Habenaria stylites Rchb.f. & S.Moore
 Habenaria suaveolens Dalzell
 Habenaria subaequalis Summerh.
 Habenaria subandina Schltr.
 Habenaria subarmata Rchb.f.
 Habenaria subauriculata B.L.Rob. & Greenm.
 Habenaria subfiliformis Cogn.
 Habenaria subviridis Hoehne & Schltr.
 Habenaria superflua Rchb.f.
 Habenaria supervacanea Rchb.f.
 Habenaria supplicans Summerh.
 Habenaria sylvicultrix Lindl. ex Kraenzl.
 Habenaria szechuanica Schltr.
 Habenaria szlachetkoana R.Gonzalez & Cuev.-Fig.
 Habenaria taeniodema Summerh.
 Habenaria tahitensis Nadeaud
 Habenaria talaensis R.Gonzalez & Cuev.-Fig.
 Habenaria tamanduensis Schltr.
 Habenaria tamazulensis R.Gonzalez & Cuev.-Fig.
 Habenaria tanzaniyana J.M.H.Shaw
 Habenaria taubertiana Cogn.
 Habenaria tentaculigera Rchb.f.
 Habenaria tequiliana R.Gonzalez & Cuev.-Fig.
 Habenaria teresae R.Gonzalez & Cuev.-Fig.
 Habenaria ternatea Rchb.f.
 Habenaria tetraceras Summerh.
 Habenaria tetranema Schltr.
 Habenaria theodori Schltr.
 Habenaria thomana Rchb.f.
 Habenaria thomsonii Rchb.f.
 Habenaria tianae P.J.Cribb & D.L.Roberts
 Habenaria tibetica Schltr.
 Habenaria tisserantii Szlach. & Olszewski
 Habenaria tomentella Rchb.f.
 Habenaria tonkinensis Seidenf.
 Habenaria torricellensis Schltr.
 Habenaria tortilis P.J.Cribb
 Habenaria tosariensis J.J.Sm.
 Habenaria trachypetala Kraenzl.
 Habenaria transvaalensis Schltr.
 Habenaria trichaete Schltr.
 Habenaria trichoceras Barb.Rodr.
 Habenaria trichoglossa Renz
 Habenaria trichosantha Lindl.
 Habenaria tricruris (A.Rich.) Rchb.f.
 Habenaria tridactylites Lindl.
 Habenaria tridens Lindl.
 Habenaria trifida Kunth
 Habenaria trifurcata Hook.f.
 Habenaria trilobulata Schltr.
 Habenaria triplonema Schltr. – twisted rein orchid
 Habenaria triquetra Rolfe
 Habenaria tropophila H.Perrier
 Habenaria truncata Lindl.
 Habenaria tsaiana T.P.Lin
 Habenaria tsaratananensis H.Perrier
 Habenaria tubifolia la Croix & P.J.Cribb
 Habenaria tuerckheimii Schltr.
 Habenaria tweedieae Summerh.
 Habenaria tysonii Bolus
 Habenaria ugandensis Summerh.
 Habenaria uhehensis Schltr.
 Habenaria ulei Cogn.
 Habenaria uliginosa Rchb.f.
 Habenaria umbraticola Barb.Rodr.
 Habenaria uncata R.Jiminez, L.Sanchez & Garcia-Cruz
 Habenaria uncatiloba C.Schweinf.
 Habenaria uncicalcar Summerh.
 Habenaria uncinata Szlach. & Olszewski
 Habenaria undulata Frapp. ex Cordem.
 Habenaria unellezii Foldats
 Habenaria unguilabris B.R.Adams
 Habenaria unifoliata Summerh.
 Habenaria urbaniana Cogn.
 Habenaria uruguayensis Garay
 Habenaria vaginata A.Rich.
 Habenaria vandenbergheniana Geerinck
 Habenaria vanoverberghii Ames
 Habenaria variabilis Ridl.
 Habenaria variegata Cuev.-Fig.
 Habenaria vasquezii Dodson
 Habenaria vatia D.L.Jones – curved rein orchid
 Habenaria velutina Summerh.
 Habenaria ventricosa Frapp. ex Cordem.
 Habenaria verdickii (De Wild.) Schltr.
 Habenaria vermeuleniana Geerinck & Schaijes
 Habenaria vesiculosa A.Rich.
 Habenaria vidua C.S.P.Parish & Rchb.f.
 Habenaria villosa Rolfe
 Habenaria virens A.Rich. & Galeotti
 Habenaria viridiflora (Rottler ex Sw.) R.Br. ex Spreng.
 Habenaria vollesenii S.Thomas & P.J.Cribb
 Habenaria walleri Rchb.f.
 Habenaria wallichii (Kolan. Kras & Szlach.) J.M.H.Shaw
 Habenaria wangii Ormerod
 Habenaria warburgana Kraenzl.
 Habenaria warmingii Rchb.f. & Warm.
 Habenaria warszewiczii Schltr.
 Habenaria weberiana Schltr.
 Habenaria weileriana Schltr.
 Habenaria welwitschii Rchb.f.
 Habenaria wercklei Schltr.
 Habenaria williamsii Schltr.
 Habenaria wolongensis K.Y.Lang
 Habenaria woodii Schltr.
 Habenaria xanthantha F.Muell. – freak rein orchid
 Habenaria xanthochlora Schltr.
 Habenaria xochitliae R.Gonzalez
 Habenaria yachangensis Z.B.Zhang & W.Guo
 Habenaria yezoensis H.Hara
 Habenaria yomensis Gage
 Habenaria yookuaaensis Meija-Marin, Espejo, Lopez-Ferr. & R.Jiminez
 Habenaria yueana Tang & F.T.Wang
 Habenaria yungasensis Schltr.
 Habenaria zambesina Rchb.f.
 Habenaria zamudioana R.Gonzalez
 Habenaria zapopana R.Gonzalez & Cuev.-Fig.
 Habenaria zollingeri Rchb.f.

Formerly placed here
 Dactylorhiza viridis (L.) R.M.Bateman et al. (as H. viridis (L.) R.Br.)
 Platanthera ciliaris (L.) Lindl. (as H. ciliaris (L.) R.Br.)
 Platanthera dilatata (Pursh) Lindl. ex L.C.Beck (as H. dilatata (Pursh) Hook.)
 Platanthera hyperborea (L.) Lindl. (as H. hyperborea (L.) R.Br.)
 Platanthera psycodes (L.) Lindl. (as H. psycodes (L.) Spreng.)
 Platanthera stricta Lindl. (as H. saccata Greene)

References 

 
Habenaria